Pterygosomatidae is a family of prostigs in the order Trombidiformes. There are at least two genera and two described species in Pterygosomatidae.

Genera
 Geckobia
 Pimeliaphilus

References

Further reading

 
 
 
 

Trombidiformes
Acari families